Jane A. Clemons is a Democratic former member of the New Hampshire House of Representatives, representing the Hillsborough 24th District since 1990. She a past Chair of the Nashua Democratic City Committee.

External links
The New Hampshire House of Representatives - Jane Clemons official NH government website
Project Vote Smart - Representative Jane Clemons (NH) profile
Follow the Money - Jane A Clemons
2006 2004 2002 2000 1998 campaign contributions
Nashua Democrats
Gone From the Granite State, But Tactics Not Forgotten Alec MacGillis, Washington Post, January 12, 2008

Members of the New Hampshire House of Representatives
Living people
Women state legislators in New Hampshire
1946 births
21st-century American women